Sant Ildefons is a station on line 5 of the Barcelona Metro.

The station is located underneath Avinguda República Argentina, between Plaça Sant Ildefons and Carrer Camèlia, in Cornellà de Llobregat. It was opened in 1976 and served as the terminus of line 5 until the extension to Cornellà Centre in 1983.

The side-platform station has a single ticket hall with two accesses.

Services

External links
 Sant Ildefons at Trenscat.com

Railway stations in Spain opened in 1976
Barcelona Metro line 5 stations
Transport in Cornellà de Llobregat